The Lulu Graves Farm is a farm located in Jerome, Idaho, United States, listed on the National Register of Historic Places. The  farm includes a house, poultry house, and cattle loafing shed, all of which were built with local lava rock. Lava rock was a popular building material in south central Idaho in the late nineteenth and early twentieth centuries, and many lava rock buildings still survive in the area. The bungalow-style farmhouse was built in 1929 or 1930 by local stonemason H.T. Pugh.

The farm was added to the National Register of Historic Places on September 8, 1983.

References

See also

 List of National Historic Landmarks in Idaho
 National Register of Historic Places listings in Jerome County, Idaho

1929 establishments in Idaho
Buildings and structures in Jerome County, Idaho
Bungalow architecture in Idaho
Farms on the National Register of Historic Places in Idaho
National Register of Historic Places in Jerome County, Idaho